John Bell Williams (December 4, 1918 – March 25, 1983) was an American Democratic politician who represented Mississippi in the U.S. House of Representatives from 1947 to 1968 and served as Governor of Mississippi from 1968 to 1972.

He was first elected to Congress in 1946, representing southwestern Mississippi. At just 27 years old, he was the youngest man to be elected U.S. Representative from Mississippi. He was re-elected repeatedly to Congress through the 1966 election in what was then a one-party Democratic state but was stripped of his congressional leadership positions after he supported Republican Barry Goldwater in the 1964 presidential election.

Williams was elected Governor in 1967, defeating numerous candidates. He had a history of supporting racial segregation but complied with a federal court order to finally desegregate Mississippi's public schools.

Early life and education
John Bell Williams was born in 1918 in Raymond, the county seat of Hinds County, near the state capital of Jackson. He graduated in 1938 from Hinds Community College, then known as Hinds Junior College. He attended the University of Mississippi at Oxford and graduated in 1940 from Mississippi College School of Law, then known simply as the Jackson Law School.

In November 1941, he enlisted with the United States Army Air Corps and served as a pilot during World War II. He retired from active service after losing the lower part of his left arm as a result of a bomber crash in 1944.

Political career
In November 1946, Williams was elected at the age of 27 (he turned 28 in December) to the U.S. House of Representatives as a Democrat from southwestern Mississippi. He was the youngest U.S. Representative to have been elected from Mississippi.

Williams advocated states' rights and racial segregation. He joined his state's delegation in a walkout of the 1948 Democratic National Convention in Philadelphia, Pennsylvania. He supported Strom Thurmond’s Dixiecrat presidential campaign, whose primary platform was racial segregation. Thurmond easily carried the electoral vote in Mississippi and three other Deep South states.

After the Supreme Court issued its Brown v. Board of Education ruling on May 17, 1954, which outlawed racial segregation in public schools, Williams made a speech on the House floor branding the day 'Black Monday', and subsequently signed the 1956 Southern Manifesto. Williams supported the Democratic Stevenson-Sparkman campaign in 1952, but he favored unpledged Democratic electors in 1956 and 1960.

In 1964, Williams endorsed Republican Barry Goldwater in the general election against incumbent president Lyndon B. Johnson and helped raise funds for Goldwater in Mississippi. Because of his activities for Goldwater, the Democratic caucus (in the House of Representatives) stripped Williams and a colleague, Albert W. Watson of South Carolina, of their House seniority.

Williams remained a Democrat and retained his seat in 1966. Watson soon became a Republican.

Governor

In 1967, Williams ran for governor. The field of candidates was large, including former Governor Ross Barnett and two future governors, William Winter and Bill Waller. In the primary campaign, Williams claimed that, during the 1962 desegregation of the University of Mississippi, former Governor Ross Barnett made a secret deal with the Kennedys over the admission of James Meredith, while publicly claiming to do everything to maintain college segregation.

In the first round of balloting, Williams finished second to the moderate candidate, William Winter. In the runoff, Williams defeated Winter by 61,000 votes. In the general election, Williams handily defeated Democrat-turned-Republican Rubel Phillips, in his second unsuccessful campaign for governor. Phillips’ running mate for lieutenant governor in 1963, Stanford Morse, a member of the Mississippi State Senate from Gulfport from 1956 to 1964, endorsed Williams in the 1967 race.

During the campaign, Williams joked that when the returns were tabulated, the Republicans “won’t be able to find a Rubel in the rubble.”

During Williams’ term as governor, Mississippi was ordered to desegregate its public school system by a federal court, as it had made little progress since the 1954 U.S. Supreme Court ruling that deemed such public schools unconstitutional. A case had been brought by civil rights activists and some desegregation of schools had happened at local levels. Williams did not defy the court. In December 1978, 24 years after Brown v. Board of Education, Mississippi legislature officially removed from its state constitution the mandate that schools be segregated.

Return to private practice
After his term, Williams resumed his law practice. Williams endorsed Republicans Gerald Ford in 1976 and Ronald Reagan in 1980 for president, rather than the Democratic nominee both times, Jimmy Carter of Georgia.

Death
After leaving office, Williams divorced his wife. He died in Rankin County on March 25, 1983, being found dead in his apartment the following day; the cause was ruled to be a heart attack. He was buried on March 28, 1983, and his funeral was held in the First Baptist Church in Jackson the following day.

See also
 Conservative Democrat

References

Works cited

External links
 
 

1918 births
1983 deaths
American amputees
American politicians with disabilities
American segregationists
American white supremacists
Democratic Party governors of Mississippi
United States Army Air Forces pilots of World War II
Hinds Community College alumni
University of Mississippi alumni
People from Brandon, Mississippi
People from Raymond, Mississippi
Mississippi College School of Law alumni
Democratic Party members of the United States House of Representatives from Mississippi
Old Right (United States)
20th-century American politicians